Hillesøy is a former municipality in the old Troms county in Norway. The municipality existed from 1855 until its dissolution in 1964. It was located on both sides of the Malangen fjord in what is now the present-day municipalities of Tromsø and Senja. The administrative centre was located at Brensholmen on the western shore of the island of Kvaløya. Brensholmen is also the location of Hillesøy Church, the main church for the municipality.

On Senja island, Hillesøy Municipality included the larger villages of Fjordgård, Husøy, and Botnhamn. On Kvaløya island, it included Ersfjordbotn and Brensholmen. The island of Sommarøya is connected to the large island of Kvaløya by the Sommarøy Bridge. Most of the other islands are only accessible by boat.

History
The municipality of Hillesøy (originally spelled Hillesø) was established in 1855 when it was separated from the large Lenvik Municipality (or it might have been in 1871–some sources do not concur). The initial population of Hillesøy was around 800 people.  During the 1960s, there were many municipal mergers across Norway due to the work of the Schei Committee.  On 1 January 1964, Hillesøy Municipality was dissolved and its lands were divided as follows:
The areas of Hillesøy on Kvaløya as well as all of the islands north of the Malangen fjord (with 1,316 inhabitants in total) were merged with the city of Tromsø (population: 12,602), the whole municipality of Tromsøysund (population: 16,727), and all of the municipality of Ullsfjord except the Svensby area (population: 2,019) to form a new, enlarged Tromsø Municipality. 
The areas of Hillesøy on the island of Senja and the little island of Hekkingen (with 1,159 inhabitants in total) merged with Lenvik Municipality (population: 8,825), the part of Tranøy Municipality along the south shore of the river Lakselva (population: 106), and the part of Sørreisa Municipality on Senja island (population: 129) to form a new, larger Lenvik Municipality.

Name
The municipality is named after the old Hillesøy farm on the island of Hillesøya since the first Hillesøy Church was originally built there. The meaning of the name is not entirely clear. The first element of the old name may come from the old Norwegian male name . Another possibility is that the name was originally . If this is the case, then the first element would be derived from the word  which means "rock slab". The last element of the name is not disputed.

Government
During its existence, this municipality was governed by a municipal council of elected representatives, which in turn elected a mayor.

Mayors
The mayors of Hillesøy:

1855-1857: Ole Johan Olsen 
1857-1859: John Pedersen 
1859-1862: Daniel Heitmann Hansen
1863-1874: John Pedersen 
1875-1878: Jacob Bolche Matheson 
1879-1883: Peder Svendsen 
1883-1886: Ole Larsen Aaker 
1887-1889: Johannes Næstaas 
1889-1904: Ole A. Hanssen 
1904-1904: Ingvald Kristoffersen
1905-1907: Samuel O. Kvamme
1907-1913: Carl Bertheussen 
1914-1919: Ingvald Kristoffersen
1920-1922: Carl Bertheussen 
1923-1925: Kristoffer O. Larsen
1926-1928: Ingvald Kristoffersen
1929-1931: Alfred Olufsen 
1932-1942: Thorvald Nordheim 
1942-1942: Carl Bersvendsen 
1942-1945: Hagerup Paulsen 
1945-1945: Alfon Engenes 
1946-1963: Edvin O. Haugland

Municipal council
The municipal council  of Hillesøy was made up of 17 representatives that were elected to four year terms.  The party breakdown of the council was as follows:

See also
List of former municipalities of Norway

References

External links

Weather information for Hillesøy 

Tromsø
Senja
Former municipalities of Norway
1855 establishments in Norway
1964 disestablishments in Norway